Tianjin Arena is an indoor sporting arena located in Tianjin Sports Center, Tianjin, China. The capacity of the arena is 10,000 spectators. The arena is used to host indoor sporting events, such as basketball and volleyball.

The hall hosted some for the 1999 World Artistic Gymnastics Championships.

References 

Indoor arenas in China
Sports venues in Tianjin